Hale is a civil parish in the borough of Halton, Cheshire, England.  The parish contains 17 buildings that are recorded in the National Heritage List for England as designated listed buildings. Of these, one is listed at Grade II*, the middle grade, and the others are at Grade II, the lowest grade.  The parish includes the village of Hale, and this is surrounded by agricultural land.  It is on the north bank of the River Mersey and includes the promontory of Hale Head.  Almost all of the listed buildings are houses and cottages in the village, the others consisting of the parish church, an ice house in the grounds of the former Hale House (now demolished), and a former lighthouse on Hale Head.

Key

Buildings

See also

Listed buildings in Ellesmere Port
Listed buildings in Frodsham

Listed buildings in Liverpool
Listed buildings in Runcorn (rural area)
Listed buildings in Runcorn (urban area)

References
Citations

Sources

Listed buildings in the Borough of Halton
Lists of listed buildings in Cheshire